The 2020–21 BCB President's Cup was a cricket competition that took place in Bangladesh from 11 to 25 October 2020. It was the first cricket to be played in Bangladesh since the start of the COVID-19 pandemic in March 2020. Three teams took part, with all the matches played at the Sher-e-Bangla National Cricket Stadium in Mirpur. The final was originally scheduled to be played on 23 October, but was moved back to 25 October due to the forecast of bad weather in Dhaka.

Squads
The following squads were named for the tournament:

Points table

 Team qualified for the finals

Fixtures

Round-robin

Final

References

External links
 Series home at ESPN Cricinfo

Bangladeshi domestic cricket competitions
BCB President's Cup
2020 in Bangladeshi cricket
Bangladeshi cricket seasons from 2000–01